Piplod is a village turns town in Dahod district, Gujarat, India.

Geography

Location
Piplod is 32 km east of Godhra. Nearest airport is Sardar Vallabhbhai Patel International Airport at Ahmedabad. National Highway 59 passes through Piplod.

Places of interest
 Jessore Sloth Bear Sanctuary

References

External links
 Satellite map of Piplod
 About Piplod

Cities and towns in Dahod district